Doomed Caravan is a 1941 American Western film directed by Lesley Selander and starring William Boyd.  The film is a serial Western and part of the Hopalong Cassidy series.  It is the 32nd entry in a series of 66 films.

Plot

Cast
William Boyd as Hopalong Cassidy
Andy Clyde as California Carlson
Russell Hayden as Lucky Jenkins
Minna Gombell as Jane Travers
Morris Ankrum as Stephen Westcott
Georgia Ellis as Diana Westcott
Trevor Bardette as Ed Martin
Pat J. O'Brien as Henchman Jim Ferber
Ray Bennett as Henchman Pete Gregg
José Luis Tortosa as Governor Don Pedro

Reception
Doomed Caravan has 3 out of 5 stars on AllMovie.

References

External links

1941 Western (genre) films
American black-and-white films
Films directed by Lesley Selander
Paramount Pictures films
American Western (genre) films
Hopalong Cassidy films
Films based on works by Johnston McCulley
Films scored by John Leipold
1940s English-language films
1940s American films